Justin Watson (born April 4, 1996) is an American football wide receiver for the Kansas City Chiefs of the National Football League (NFL). He played college football at Penn and was drafted by the Tampa Bay Buccaneers in the fifth round of the 2018 NFL Draft.

College career
Watson played four years for the Quakers and was a three-time All-Ivy League selection (2015–17) and a two-time Ivy League champion (2015, 2016). He set the Penn career records for receptions, receiving yards, receiving touchdowns, and all-purpose yards. He also holds the record for the most receiving yards in conference play in Ivy League history.

Professional career

Tampa Bay Buccaneers
Watson was drafted by the Tampa Bay Buccaneers in the fifth round with the 144th overall pick in the 2018 NFL Draft. He made his NFL debut on September 30, 2018, against the Chicago Bears. Watson caught his first career pass, a five-yard reception, on October 29, 2018, in a 37–34 loss to the Cincinnati Bengals. As a rookie, he appeared in 12 games. On December 8, 2019, he caught his first career touchdown, a 17-yard reception from quarterback Jameis Winston. In the 2019 season, he appeared in all 16 games and recorded 15 receptions for 159 receiving yards and two receiving touchdowns.

In Week 10 of the 2020 season against the Carolina Panthers, Watson recorded his first career sack on punter Joseph Charlton during a fake punt attempt during the 46–23 win.  Watson was the first offensive player in Buccaneers' history to record a sack. He appeared in 11 games and recorded seven receptions for 94 yards on the season. Watson and the Buccaneers later went on to win Super Bowl LV against the Kansas City Chiefs 31-9.

On July 24, 2021, it was announced that Watson would be out four months after undergoing knee surgery, and was placed on the PUP list. He was placed on the reserve/physically unable to perform list on August 31, 2021. He was activated on December 24. He appeared in one game in the 2021 season. He was waived on January 15, 2022, and re-signed to the practice squad.

Kansas City Chiefs
The Kansas City Chiefs signed Watson to a one-year deal on February 4, 2022. In the 2022 season, Watson appeared in all 17 games, of which he started five. He finished with 15 receptions for 315 receiving yards and two receiving touchdowns. In Watson's first season with the Chiefs, they won Super Bowl LVII against the Philadelphia Eagles 38-35 with Watson catching two passes for 18 yards.

References

External links

Kansas City Chiefs bio
Penn Quakers bio

1996 births
Living people
People from Bridgeville, Pennsylvania
American football wide receivers
Penn Quakers football players
Players of American football from Pennsylvania
Sportspeople from the Pittsburgh metropolitan area
Tampa Bay Buccaneers players
Kansas City Chiefs players